Ohum Festival is a traditional festival celebrated by Akuapems and Akyems in the Eastern Region of Ghana.

The festival is celebrated on a Tuesday/Wednesdays in September or October depending on the month Ohumkan festival was celebrated by the Akyems and on a Sunday in December or January for the people of Akuapem. Prior to it celebration, a two week ban on noise-making is imposed. The Akyems thank their creator for blessing their land with the Birim river. They use products from their lands and the river as symbols to remember their ancestors who struggled and persevered in keeping their society intact. The people give pledges to continue the tradition and to keep their kingdom strong and free with prosperity and peace during the festival. They give pledge of allegiance to their king and his sub-chiefs and elders for their leadership and guidance.

Ohumkyire is celebrated to give thanks to God for the New Yam Harvest and sake His favour in the coming year. Also to celebrate the Akyem Nation.

Gallery

References

Festivals in Ghana